Indestructible is a jazz album by drummer Art Blakey and his Jazz Messengers. It was recorded in 1964 but not released until 1966, and was Blakey's last recording for Blue Note. The bonus track featured on the CD reissue was originally issued on Pisces.

This was the final recording for half of the band's members:  Wayne Shorter  would leave to join the Miles Davis Quintet and be replaced (briefly) by John Gilmore, bassist Reggie Workman would be replaced by Victor Sproles, and pianist Cedar Walton would leave to be replaced by John Hicks.

Track listing
"The Egyptian" (Fuller) – 10:25
"Sortie" (Fuller) – 8:13
"Calling Miss Khadija" (Morgan) – 7:21
"When Love is New" (Walton) – 6:02
"Mr. Jin" (Shorter) – 7:04
"It's a Long Way Down" (Shorter) – 5:26 Bonus track on CD

Recorded on April 24 (#5) and May 15 (#1-4), 1964. Bonus track on April 15, 1964.

Personnel
Art Blakey — drums
Lee Morgan — trumpet
Curtis Fuller — trombone
Wayne Shorter — tenor saxophone
Cedar Walton — piano
Reggie Workman — bass

References 

1966 albums
Art Blakey albums
The Jazz Messengers albums
Blue Note Records albums
Albums produced by Alfred Lion
Albums recorded at Van Gelder Studio